The Antoinette VII was an early French aircraft, flown in 1909.

History
The VII was a further development of the Antoinette IV, with increased engine power and using a wing warping system implemented by Levavasseur for the Antoinette V in place of the Antoinette IV's ailerons.

With this aircraft, Levavasseur hoped that Antoinette test pilot Hubert Latham would be able to make the crossing of the English Channel that he had previously attempted in the Antoinette IV and claim the Daily Mail prize then on offer. As it happened, the Antoinette VII's first flight took place on 25 July 1909, the same day that Louis Blériot succeeded in crossing the channel in his Blériot XI. Undaunted, Latham made the attempt anyway on 27 July. He and the aircraft were rescued by HMS Russell.

The following month, Latham flew the same aircraft at the Grande Semaine d'Aviation de la Champagne, winning the prize for altitude (155 m, 509 ft) and coming second in the contest for the fastest circuit, with a speed of  68.9 km/h, 42.8 mph

Specifications

See also 

 Gastambide-Mengin monoplane
 Antoinette III
 Antoinette IV
 Antoinette V
 Antoinette VI
 Antoinette military monoplane
 Fedor Ivanovich Bylinkin, designer of a similar aircraft, 1910

 Antoinette VII un avión con historia

References

 
 World Aircraft Information Files. Brightstar Publishing: London. File 889 Sheet 63.

External links 

 Antoinette VII en Argentina

High-wing aircraft
Single-engined tractor aircraft
1900s French experimental aircraft
7
Aircraft first flown in 1909